

Africa
Sidiki Bakaba
Safi Faye
Sorious Samura (Cry Freetown, Return to Freetown, Exodus, Living with Hunger, Living with Refugees)
Nolan Davis (Passing Through: Woni Spotts, The First Black Woman to Travel to Every Country and Continent (1989)

Asia
Aryana Farshad (Iran)
Channa Rai (India)
Ammar Aziz (Pakistan)
Anu Malhotra (India)
Sadaf Foroughi (Iran)
Suma Josson 
Susumu Hani
Kazuo Hara
Fumio Kamei
Toshio Matsumoto
Tatsuya Mori
Shinsuke Ogawa
Anand Patwardhan (India)
Artavazd Ashoti Peleshyan (Armenian)
David Perlov
Mohammad Bakri (Palestine)
Avi Mograbi (Israeli Moroccan)
Nissim Mossek (Israel)
Makoto Satō
Noriaki Tsuchimoto
Mikhail Vartanov (Armenia) (Parajanov: The Last Spring )
Wang Bing
Ruby Yang
Maheen Zia (Pakistan)
Anwar Hajher
Satyaprakash Upadhyay (India) (Bunkar - The Last of the Varanasi Weavers)

Australia
Wayne Coles-Janess (In the Shadow of the Palms)
George Gittoes (Soundtrack to War)
John Pilger (Year Zero: The Silent Death of Cambodia, Vietnam: the Last Battle, Stealing a Nation)

Europe
Michael Apted (Seven Up!)
William Bemister
Patrick Bokanowski
António Campos
Pedro Costa
Adam Curtis (The Century of the Self, The Trap, The Power of Nightmares)
Denis Delestrac (Pax Americana)
Mike Dibb
Vanessa Engle (Lefties)
Harun Farocki
Erik Gandini (Videocracy)
James Gay-Rees (Senna, Amy, Ronaldo)
Jo Gilbert (Great West End Theatres series)
John Grierson
Johannes Grenzfurthner
Bert Haanstra
Werner Herzog (Grizzly Man)
Marcel Ichac (France, exploration and mountain films)
Joris Ivens
Asif Kapadia (Senna, Amy)
Ross Kemp 
Sean Langan (Langan behind the Lines, Langan in Iraq, Travels of a Gringo)
Claude Lanzmann (Shoah)
Jørgen Leth (The Five Obstructions)
Willy Lindwer (The Last Seven Months of Anne Frank)
Sean McAllister, filmmaker (Liberace of Baghdad, The Minders)
Chris Marker
Arūnas Matelis (Before Flying Back to the Earth)
James Miller (Death in Gaza)
George Morrison (Mise Éire)
Michel Noll
Marcel Ophüls
Jacques Perrin (Le Peuple Migrateur)
Jos de Putter
António Reis
Alain Resnais (Night and Fog)
Leni Riefenstahl
Jean Rouch
Michael Schindhelm (The Chinese Lives of Uli Sigg)
Tomasz Sekielski (Tell No One)
Marc Sinden (Great West End Theatres series)
Louis Theroux
Virgilio Tosi
Agnés Varda
Dziga Vertov
Lars von Trier (The Five Obstructions)
Peter Watkins (The War Game, Punishment Park, Culloden (film), Edvard Munch (film)) 
Leslie Woodhead (Children of Beslan, A Cry from the Grave, Godless in America)
Thierry Zéno
Lydia Zimmermann

Latin America
Tomas Gutierrez Alea
Santiago Álvarez
Julia Bacha (Brazil)
Fernando Birri
Eduardo Montes-Bradley (Evita: The Documentary, Che: Rise and Fall, Waissman, Calzada, Samba on Your Feet)
Patricio Guzman
Miguel Littin
Paul Leduc
Fernando E. Solanas
Salvador Espinosa Orozco  (TEOKARI Compañero de Camino)

North America
Aryana Farshad (Mystic Iran, the Unseen World), ( Longing for the Soul, A Quest for Rumi-2019)
Mitch Anderson
Emile de Antonio
Denys Arcand
Timothy Asch (The Ax Fight)
Joe Berlinger and Bruce Sinofsky (Brother's Keeper, Paradise Lost: The Child Murders at Robin Hood Hills, Metallica: Some Kind of Monster)
Les Blank (Burden of Dreams) 
Doug Block (51 Birch Street, Home Page)
Michel Brault
Sam Bozzo (Can You Hack It?)
George Butler (Pumping Iron, In the Blood, Roving Mars, Shackleton's Antarctic Adventure, The Lord God Bird, Going Upriver: The Long War of John Kerry)
Ken Burns (Baseball, Jazz, The Civil War)
Ric Burns (New York: A Documentary Film)
Jim Butterworth (Seoul Train)
Steven Cantor (Step, Dancer, Between Me and My Mind, What Remains, Chasing Tyson)
Lesley Chilcott (Waiting for 'Superman', An Inconvenient Truth, CodeGirl, A Small Section of the World)
Jimmy Chin (Free Solo, Meru (film)) 
Matthew Cooke (How to Make Money Selling Drugs)
Merian C. Cooper and Ernest B. Schoedsack
Patrick Creadon (Wordplay, I.O.U.S.A.)
George Csicsery
Khashyar Darvich (Dalai Lama Renaissance)
Peter Davis (director) (Hearts and Minds (film)) 
Kirby Dick (Sick: The Life and Death of Bob Flanagan, Supermasochist, Twist of Faith, This Film Is Not Yet Rated, Outrage)
Paul Devlin (SlamNation, Power Trip)
Chris Donahue (Be Good, Smile Pretty)
Dinesh D'Souza (2016: Obama's America, America: Imagine the World Without Her)
Ava DuVernay (13th (film)) 
Lilibet Foster (Soul in the Hole, Speaking in Strings, Brotherhood: Life in the FDNY, Be Here Now (The Andy Whitfield Story))
Robert J. Flaherty
Su Friedrich (Hide and Seek)
Liz Garbus (What Happened, Miss Simone?)
Paul Gardner (writer)
Robert Gardner (Dead Birds)
Catherine Gund (A Touch of Greatness), (Born To Fly: Elizabeth Streb vs. Gravity)
Lauren Greenfield (Thin, kids+money)
Gilles Groulx
Monica Hampton (Slacker Uprising, Heavy Metal in Baghdad)
Mark Jonathan Harris (The Long Way Home, Into the Arms of Strangers: Stories of the Kindertransport)
Tigre Hill (The Shame of A City, Barrel of a Gun)
John E. Hudgens (American Scary)
Leslie Iwerks (The Pixar Story, Recycled Life) 
Steve James (Hoop Dreams)
Kartemquin Films (Gordon Quinn, Jerry Blumenthal, Steve James, Peter Gilbert, et al.)
Mary Rosanne Katzke 
Tim Kirkman (Dear Jesse)
Vivian Kleiman
Barbara Kopple (Harlan County, USA, American Dream, both Academy Award winners)
Martin Kunert (Voices of Iraq)
Richard Leacock
Grace Lee (American Revolutionary: The Evolution of Grace Lee Boggs)
Logan Leistikow (The Comedy Garage)
Brian Lindstrom (Alien Boy: The Life and Death of James Chasse)
James Longley (Iraq in Fragments)
Kevin Macdonald (One Day in September, Touching the Void)
Eric Manes (Voices of Iraq)
Ron Mann (Comic Book Confidential, Twist, Grass)
John Marshall (The Hunters)
Albert Maysles and David Maysles (Salesman, Grey Gardens, Gimme Shelter)
Ross McElwee (Time Indefinite, Sherman's March)
Freida Lee Mock (Maya Lin: A Strong Clear Vision, an Academy Award winner; Bird by Bird with Annie, a portrait of Anne Lamott)
Eduardo Montes-Bradley (Evita, Che: Rise and Fall)
Michael Moore (Roger & Me, Bowling for Columbine, Fahrenheit 9/11, The Big One, Sicko)
Errol Morris (The Thin Blue Line, Vernon, Florida, Fast, Cheap and Out of Control, The Fog of War)
John Mulholland (Cooper & Hemingway: The True Gen)
Alanis Obomsawin
Charles Olivier (Magic & Bird: A Courtship of Rivals)
Joshua Oppenheimer (The Act of Killing, The Look of Silence) 
D. A. Pennebaker (Dont Look Back, Monterey Pop)
Pierre Perrault
Phil Ranstrom (Cheat You Fair: The Story of Maxwell Street)
Frances Reid (Long Night's Journey Into Day) 
Velcrow Ripper (Scared Sacred)
Steven Rosenbaum (7 Days in September) 
Jillian Schlesinger (Maidentrip: A Teen's Solo Voyage Around The World)
Steven Sebring (Patti Smith: Dream of Life)
Amy Serrano (The Sugar Babies)
Christopher Seufert
Jeff Chiba Stearns
Ondi Timoner (We Live in Public, DIG!)
Michael Wadleigh (Woodstock (film)) 
Lucy Walker (Devil's Playground, Blindsight
Reid Williams (Dangerous Living: Coming Out in the Developing World, Cruel and Unusual: Transgender Women in Prison, Were the World Mine)
Frederick Wiseman (High School, Titicut Follies)
Ruby Yang (The Blood of Yingzhou District), (My Voice, My Life)
Jessica Yu (Breathing Lessons: The Life and Work of Mark O'Brien)

References

Documentary
Documentary-related lists